Luke Marshall (born 3 March 1991) is an Irish rugby union player, who plays centre for Ulster, and has 11 caps for Ireland, the last coming in 2017.

While in the Ulster academy, he played in an exhibition match between an Ulster-Leinster team against a Munster-Connacht team that opened the Aviva Stadium in August 2010. In the 2010–11 season, he made seven appearances, including three starts, and scored a try. He played for Ireland at under-20 level in the 2011 Six Nations Under 20s Championship and the 2011 IRB Junior World Championship. The following season he made seven more appearances, including two starts and scored one try. In 2012–13 he made 18 appearances, including 10 starts, and made his debut in the Heineken Cup. He played in a non-cap Ireland XV that defeated Fiji 53-0 in November 2012. He won his first senior international cap on 24 February 2013, starting in the defeat against Scotland in the 2013 Six Nations Championship. He was named 2012–13 Pro12 Young Player of the Season, and in the Pro12 Dream Team. 

In 2013–14 he made 26 appearances for Ulster, including 24 starts, and scored six tries. He played for Ireland against Australia in November 2013, in two matches in the 2014 Six Nations Championship, and against Argentina in June 2014. He missed much of the 2014–15 season, suffering a knee injury in October 2014 and a concussion in January 2015, and being suspended for five matches after being cited for kicking an opponent in March 2015. In 2015–16 he made 21 appearances, including 20 starts, and scored four tries. He played twice in Ireland's tour of South Africa in June 2016.

In 2016–17 he made 22 appearances, including 19 starts, and scored seven tries, with 30 defenders beaten, 155 tackles and 10 turnovers won. He made his 100th appearance for the province in April 2017. He appeared for Ireland against Canada in November 2016, and against the USA and Japan in June 2017. In 2017–18 he made 16 appearances, including 12 starts, six turnovers and three try assists, but suffered an anterior cruciate ligament injury in May 2018 that kept him out for most of the 2018–19 season. In 2019–20 he made 16 appearances, all starts, and scored three tries. A knee injury sustained in November 2020 that kept him out for almost 18 months. He returned to action in March 2022.

References

External links
Ulster Rugby profile
United Rugby Championship profile

Ireland profile

1991 births
Living people
Ulster Rugby players
Ireland international rugby union players
Irish rugby union players
Rugby union centres
Rugby union players from Ballymena